Ali Hamoudi is an Iranian football defender who plays for Shahin Bushehr F.C. in the Iran Pro League.

Club career

Club career statistics

 Assist Goals

Honours

Country
WAFF Championship Winner: 1
2008

Club
Iran's Premier Football League
Winner: 1 
2012–13 with Esteghlal
Runner up: 1
2006–07 with Esteghlal Ahvaz
Hazfi Cup 
Winner: 1
2011–12 with Esteghlal

References

External links
 
Ali hamoudi  on instagram

1986 births
Living people
Iranian footballers
Persian Gulf Pro League players
Sepahan S.C. footballers
Esteghlal F.C. players
Esteghlal Ahvaz players
Foolad FC players
Sanat Mes Kerman F.C. players
Iran international footballers
Association football defenders
People from Ahvaz
Sportspeople from Khuzestan province